Surjya Narayan Patro is an Indian politician from Biju Janata Dal who served as Speaker of Odisha Legislative Assembly. In June 2022, he resigned from his post.

References 

Indian politicians
Bharatiya Janata Party politicians from Odisha
Odisha MLAs 2019–2024
Speakers of the Odisha Legislative Assembly
Living people
Year of birth missing (living people)